The  is a boundary stone at the tripoint of the German federal states of Lower Saxony, Saxony-Anhalt and Thuringia near the  mountain in the Harz.

Location 
The  is located in the South Harz at the tripoint of the three aforementioned states and also the tripoint of the counties of Goslar (Lower Saxony), Harz (Saxony-Anhalt) and Nordhausen (Thuringia). In addition the nature parks of Harz (Lower Saxony), Harz/Saxony-Anhalt and South Harz meet here. The  passes by just under 100 m southwest of the stone. There is a car park for hikers here called .

History and description 
The  was probably erected by 1749. It bears the inscription: HB ('Duchy of Brunswick'), AB, which was later changed to KP ('Kingdom of Prussia'), and GW ('Comital Wernigerode Forest Estate').

During the Cold War (1945–1990) the stone became a boundary point along the Inner German Border, from 1945 between the British Zone of Occupation in the west and the Soviet Zone of Occupation in the east; and from 1949 between West and East Germany. The so-called Iron Curtain including the Convoy Way ran past this point. The Convoy Way used to act as a border patrol track, but is now a hiking trail.

Since 3 October 1990, German Unity Day, the boundary stone has marked the borders of Lower Saxony, Saxony-Anhalt and Thuringia. It is now part of the German Green Belt.

Hiking 
The  is no. 47 in the system of checkpoints in the  hiking system.

References 

Border tripoints
Monuments and memorials in Germany
Harz